Sharon Louden (born 1964) is an American artist known for her whimsical use of the line. Her paintings, drawings, animations, sculptures, and installations are often centered on lines or linear abstractions and their implied actual movement. Through her work, she creates what she calls "anthropomorphic individuals." Although abstract and formal, she feels they have human-like aspects within their minimal state, made of simple lines and gestures. In reference to her minimalist paintings, Louden has been called "the Robert Ryman of the 21st century."

Biography and Notable Works
Louden has become known for her large-scale installations using aluminum in both public and museum forums. Upon completion of an exhibition of suspended aluminum in early 2017 entitled, "Windows," at the Tweed Museum of Art, she was commissioned for a permanent installation using suspended aluminum in the lobby of a public building in Houston, Texas. Subsequent iterations of "Windows" were completed at the University of Wyoming Museum of Art (2018-2020), Philbrook Museum of Art (2019-2020), and a permanent installation in the lobby of a new public building in Oklahoma City, Oklahoma.

In October 2011, Louden's installation Merge opened at the Weisman Art Museum in Minneapolis, Minnesota. Merge was created in dialogue with the Frank Gehry designed a new addition to the Weisman Art Museum in Minneapolis, Minnesota. The first iteration of Merge was exhibited at the Munson Williams Proctor Institute Museum of Art in 2004 and evolved since then. Of Merge, Janet Koplos of Art in America writes "...the energetic Merge, perhaps Louden’s best work to date, clearly succeeds on its own merits and would be satisfying anywhere."

Louden's work is held in major public and private collections including the Whitney Museum of American Art, National Gallery of Art, Neuberger Museum of Art, Arkansas Arts Center, Yale University Art Gallery, Weatherspoon Art Museum, and the Museum of Fine Arts, Houston, among others. She has received a grant from the Elizabeth Foundation, New York Foundation for the Arts, and the Ford Foundation and has participated in residencies at the Tamarind Institute, Urban Glass, Art Omi, and The Marie Walsh Sharpe Art Foundation.

Her work is represented by Signs & Symbols Gallery in New York City, Patrick Heide Contemporary Art in London, and Holly Johnson Gallery in Dallas, Texas.

Early life and education 
Sharon Louden was born in Philadelphia, Pennsylvania and raised in Olney, Maryland. Louden has three siblings: Mimi Louden, Karen Louden Allanach, and Jill Louden. Louden graduated from Sherwood High School in Sandy Spring, Maryland. She received her BFA from the School of the Art Institute of Chicago (SAIC) in 1988, where she studied with Dan Gustin and Susanna Coffey. Louden received her MFA from Yale School of Art in 1991. At Yale, her mentors were Mel Bochner, William Bailey, Andrew Forge and Frances Barth. She received Yale's Schickle-Collingwood Prize in 1990.

Louden studied figurative painting at SAIC. However, through her education at Yale, her work merged into abstraction, creating a foundation for her work seen today.

Career

Selected solo exhibitions 

Philbrook Museum of Art, Tulsa, OK
Signs & Symbols Gallery, New York, NY
University of Wyoming Art Museum, Laramie, WY
Tweed Museum of Art, Duluth, MN
Asheville Art Museum, Asheville, NC
Beta Pictoris Gallery, Birmingham, AL
Morgan Lehman Gallery, New York, NY
Holly Johnson Gallery, Dallas, TX
Weisman Art Museum, Minneapolis, MN
Burnet Gallery, Minneapolis, MN
Gallery Joe, Philadelphia, PA
Weatherspoon Art Museum, Greensboro, NC
Birmingham Museum of Art, Birmingham, AL
Oliver Kamm/5BE Gallery, New York, NY
Neuberger Museum of Art, Purchase, NY
Numark Gallery, Washington DC
Anthony Grant, Inc., New York, NY
Clark University, Worcester, MA
Ambrosino Gallery, Miami, FL
Kemper Museum of Contemporary Art, Kansas City, MO
DiverseWorks ArtSpace, Houston, TX
Numark Gallery, Washington DC
Urban Institute for Contemporary Arts, Grand Rapids, MI
Rhona Hoffman Gallery, Chicago, IL
Dee/Glasoe Gallery, New York, NY
Haines Gallery, San Francisco, CA
Carnegie Mellon University, Pittsburgh, PA
Works on Paper, Inc., Los Angeles, CA
Delaware Center for the Contemporary Arts, Wilmington, DE
Rhona Hoffman Gallery, Chicago, IL
Haines Gallery, San Francisco, CA
Richard Anderson Fine Arts, New York, NY
Islip Art Museum, East Islip, NY
Gina Fiore Salon of Fine Arts, New York, NY

Selected collections 
Louden's work is held in major public and private collections throughout the United States, Asia and Europe including:
 Arkansas Arts Center
 AT&T
 Beverly Hills Cultural Center Foundation
 Birmingham Museum of Art
 British Petroleum Amoco Corporation
 Cleveland Clinic
 Delaware Art Museum
 General Mills
 Hallmark Cards Corporation
 Mabrey Bank
 Microsoft Corporation
 Munson Williams Proctor Institute Museum of Art
 Museum of Fine Arts, Houston
 National Gallery of Art
 National Museum of Women in the Arts
 Neuberger Museum of Art
 Panasonic USA
 Pfizer, Inc., World Headquarters
 Progressive Corporation
 Saks Fifth Avenue
 San Francisco General Hospital
 Starwood Urban Investments
 Teacher's Insurance and Annuity Association
 The Chambers Hotel
 University of Richmond Museums
 Weatherspoon Art Museum
 Weisman Art Museum
 Whitney Museum of American Art
 Yahoo! Corporate Headquarters
 Yale University Art Gallery
 Werner H. Kramarsky

Animations 

Sharon Louden has exhibited her animations in galleries, museums, and film festivals across the country since 2006. Inspired by many artists, including Shel Silverstein, animation has become an important aspect of the development of Louden's overall visual language.

Her first series of animations were included in a 2006 solo exhibition entitled "Character," which was a survey of paintings, drawings, installations, prints, and animation at the Neuberger Museum of Art, curated by Dede Young. Also in 2006, "Pool" was included in the Art Video Lounge exhibition curated by Michael Rush for the Art Basel Miami Art Fair. Since then, Louden has continued making animations, including her latest - "Untitled (in dialogue with Len Lye, "Free Radicals")" completed in 2017.

Many of her animations were surveyed in various children's film festivals in the US from 2008-2009. In particular, "The Bridge," completed in 2008, was shown at the Birmingham Museum of Art, Weatherspoon Art Museum, Johnson Museum of Art at Cornell University, and Gallery Joe in Philadelphia, Pennsylvania. It was also screened at the Queens International Film Festival and the New York Downtown Film Festival Audience Choice Screening in 2009. Because of the positive audience response at the screening, "The Bridge" was selected for inclusion in the New York Downtown Film Festival in 2010. Her animations have also been shown in many more film festivals nationally and abroad, including the Athens International Film and Video Festival in Athens, OH, and the Honolulu International Film Festival, where she received an award for Excellence in Filmmaking in 2009. In 2010, Louden was the recipient of the Bronze Palm Award from the Mexico International Film Festival for "The Bridge."

Between 2011 and 2017, Louden was commissioned by the National Gallery of Art to both create new animations and to help curate three film screenings of abstract animation: Ciné-Concert: Art in Motion! (2011), Ciné-Concert: Abstract Film Since 1970 (2013), and Ciné-Concert: Contemporary Experiments in Animation (2017). "Footprints", "Hedge", "The Bridge", and "Carrier" were screened in the East Wing Auditorium in 2011; "Community in 2013; and "Untitled (in dialogue with Len Lye, "Free Radicals")" in 2017. During these programs Louden's animations were screened with other notable works, such as "Lines Horizontal" Norman McLaren (1962); "Two Space" Larry Cuba (1979); "Free Radicals" Len Lye (1958); "Symphonie Diagonal" Viking Eggeling (1924); "Silence" Jules Engel (1968); and "Chemical Sundown" by Jeremy Blake (2001), to name a few. All of the animations were accompanied by live piano and percussion compositions by Andrew Simpson. Stills of animations appear in various published catalogs, such as: "Character", "Taking Turns" and "The Bridge". Ten animations (2005–2011) are also included in the Iota Center's library collection.

Public works 

Louden has worked in the realm of public art since 1998. Her work often includes industrial materials that are transformed to resemble forms in nature, including movement that references the human body. Public Art projects include "Reflecting Tips" in Sunnyvale, California (1999-2008), "Shag Pools" in Shafer, Minnesota (2015), "Untitled" in Houston, Texas (2017), and "Windows: Reflections of Mabrey" in Oklahoma City, Oklahoma (2020). In 2013, Louden was commissioned by the Connecticut Department of Community and Economic Development Art in Public Spaces Program for a site-specific large-scale installation located in Oak Hall at the University of Connecticut, entitled "Merge at University of Connecticut".

Louden has also made temporary public art installations, such as "Tangled Tips" at Metro Tech business park in Brooklyn, NY, through the Public Art Fund in 2000.

Book projects 
Louden is the editor of two books: Living and Sustaining a Creative Life: Essays by 40 Working Artists and Artist as Culture Producer: Living and Sustaining a Creative Life, both published by Intellect Books, and distributed by the University of Chicago Press. The reach of both books has been extensive, with Forbes Magazine writing, "From the development of creative communities in the desert to creating artist residencies that are particularly conducive for motherhood, every artist's story is a testament to the resilience and a demonstration of the resourcefulness required to navigate the industry today."

The first book includes essays by artists Julie Blackmon, Sharon Butler, Amanda Church, Maureen Connor, Will Cotton, Blane de St. Croix, Jennifer Dalton, Karin Davie, Jay Davis, Peter Drake, Carson Fox, Michelle Grabner, The Art Guys, Erik Hanson, Ellen Harvey, Julie Heffernan, Laurie Hogin, David Humphrey, Tony Ingrisano, Thomas Kilpper, Richard Klein, Julie Langsam, Annette Lawrence, Beth Lipman, Jenny Marketou, Sean Mellyn, Maggie Michael, Peter Newman, Tim Nolan, Brian Novatny, Adrienne Outlaw, Amy Pleasant, Melissa Potter, Justin Quinn, Kate Shepherd, Dan Steinhilber, George Stoll, Austin Thomas, Brian Tolle, and Michael Waugh as well as a foreword by Carter Foster, Deputy Director of the Blanton Museum of Art and a conclusion by Ed Winkleman and Bill Carroll, Director of the Elizabeth Foundation for the Arts Studio Program.

Contributors to Louden's "Artist as Culture Producer" include: Alec Soth (Little Brown Mushroom), Alison Wong (Butter Projects), Andrea Zittel, Austin Thomas, Billy Dufala and Steven Dufala (Rair Philly), Brett Wallace (The Conversation Project), Caitlin Masley, Cara Ober (BMoreArt), Carrie Moyer (Dyke Action Machine), Carron Little (Out of Site Chicago), Chloe Bass, Duncan MacKenzie (Bad at Sports), Edgar Arceneaux, Euan Gray, Faina Lerman and Graem Whyte, Jane South, Jayme McLellan, Jean Shin, Julia Kunin, Kat Kiernan (Don't Take Pictures), Khaled Sabsabi, Lenka Clayton, Mark Tribe, Martina Geccelli (Raumx London), Matthew Deleget (Minus Space), Michael Scoggins, Morehshin Allahyari, Paul Henry Ramirez, Peewee Roldan (Green Papaya Art Projects), Robert Yoder (Season), Sharon Butler (Two Coats of Paint), Shinique Smith, Stephanie Syjuco, Steve Lambert (The Center for Artistic Activism), Tim Doud and Zoë Charlton ('sindikit), Wendy Red Star, William Powhida. Additional contributors include: Hrag Vartanian, Editor-in-Chief and Co-founder of Hyperallergic (Foreword), and Deana Haggag, Director of USA Artists in Chicago, IL, Courtney Fink, Co-founder of Common Field, and Chen Tamir Curator at the Center for Contemporary Art in Tel Aviv, Israel (Conclusion).

A 62-stop Conversation Tour supported the first book:
 2015
Society of the Four Arts in Palm Beach, FL;
Girls Club Foundation, Ft. Lauderdale, FL;
Sea Change Conference at the University of Minnesota (Twin Cities);
Minnesota Museum of American Art, St. Paul, MN;
Rochester Art Center, Rochester, MN
 2014
Chautauqua Institution, Chautauqua, NY;
Boston Public Library, Boston, MA;
AS220, Providence, RI;
Real Art Ways, Hartford, CT;
University of North Texas, Denton, TX;
Holly Johnson Gallery, Dallas, TX;
Elizabeth Foundation for the Arts, New York, NY;
Pocket Utopia, New York, NY;
Montclair State University, Montclair, NJ;
Trifecta Gallery, Las Vegas, NV;
Los Angeles Art Association, Los Angeles, CA;
Los Angeles County Museum of Art, Los Angeles, CA;
Richmond Art Center, Richmond, CA;
University of California, Davis, CA;
Sotheby’s Institute, Los Angeles, CA;
Otis College of Art and Design, Los Angeles, CA;
CB1 Gallery, Los Angeles, CA;
Strand Book Store, New York, NY;
Boston University, Boston, MA;
College of St. Benedict/St. John’s University, St. Cloud, MN;
Burnet Art Gallery, Minneapolis, MN;
Des Moines Art Center, Des Moines, IA;
Artspace, New Haven, CT;
Rutgers University, New Brunswick, NJ;
Pennsylvania Academy of Fine Arts, Philadelphia, PA;
Beta Pictoris/Maus Contemporary, Birmingham, AL;
Book Fair at the College Art Association, Chicago, IL;
Indiana University, Bloomington, IN;
Lyme Academy, Old Lyme, CT;
Hirshhorn Museum and Sculpture Garden, Washington, DC;
92nd Street Y, New York, NY;
Aberson Exhibits in Tulsa, OK
 2013
Art Basel Miami Beach Art Fair, Salon Programming, Miami Beach, FL;
School of the Art Institute of Chicago, Chicago, IL;
University of Illinois Urbana-Champaign, Urbana-Champaign, IL;
Columbia College, Chicago, IL;
Cannonball at Locust Projects, Miami, FL;
Minus Space, Brooklyn, NY;
New York Academy of Art, New York, NY;
Morgan Lehman Gallery, New York, NY;
University of Connecticut Co-Op, Storrs, CT;
Kenise Barnes Fine Art, Larchmont, NY;
Arts Westchester, White Plains, NY;
Aldrich Contemporary Art Museum, Ridgefield, CT;
Seed Space, Nashville, TN;
Barnes & Noble Bookstore at Vanderbilt University, Nashville, TN;
Curb Center for Art, Enterprise and Public Policy at Vanderbilt University, Nashville, TN;
Salina Arts Center, Salina, KS.

A 102-stop book tour supported Louden's second book:
 2018
Alaska: Ketchikan, Juneau, Anchorage, Fairbanks;
Cornish College of the Arts, Seattle, WA;
University of Washington, Seattle, WA;
Eastern Michigan University, Ypsilanti, MI;
Pennsylvania College of Fine Arts, Philadelphia, PA;
Grinnell College, Grinnell, IA;
University of North Texas, Denton, TX;
Ohio University, Athens, OH;
New York Academy of Art, New York, NY;
Macalester College, St. Paul, MN;
Minneapolis College of Art and Design, Minneapolis, MN;
21c Museum Hotel, Bentonville, AR;
Contemporary Art Museum Houston, Houston, TX;
University of Houston Center for Arts, Houston, TX;
Palm Springs Art Museum, Palm Springs, CA;
Blue Star Contemporary, San Antonio, TX;
Jack S. Blanton Museum of Art at the University of Texas at Austin, Austin, TX;
Museum of Contemporary Art Jacksonville, Jacksonville, FL;
The Mennello Museum of American Art, Orlando, FL;
Perez Art Museum, Miami, FL
 2017
Urban Glass, Brooklyn, NY;
Harvester Arts, Wichita, KS;
Pacific Northwest College of Art, Portland, OR;
Oregon State University, Corvallis, OR;
Pratt Munson Williams Proctor College of Art and Design, Utica, NY;
21c Museum Hotel, Oklahoma City, OK;
Philbrook Museum of Art, Tulsa, OK;
Herberger Institute for Design and the Arts at Arizona State University, Tempe, AZ;
University of Arizona School of Art, Tucson, AZ;
Lyme Academy College of Fine Arts, Old Lyme, NY;
Bath Spa University School of Art and Design, Bath, United Kingdom;
Bowdoin College Museum of Art, Brunswick, ME;
Maine College of Art, Portland, ME;
Rutgers Mason School of the Arts, New Brunswick, NJ;
Elizabeth Foundation for the Arts, New York, NY;
Pratt Institute, Brooklyn, NY;
International Sculpture Center at MANA Contemporary, Newark, NJ;
Duluth Art Institute, Duluth, MN;
21c Museum Hotel, Cincinnati, OH;
21c Museum Hotel, Lexington, KY;
21c Museum Hotel, Louisville, KY;
Ox-Bow, Saugatuck, MI;
Chautauqua School of Art, Chautauqua, NY;
Cue Art Foundation, New York, NY;
21c Museum Hotel, Durham, NC;
Aldrich Contemporary Art Museum, Ridgefield, CT;
Artspace, New Haven, CT;
11th Annual Encaustic Conference, Castle Hill, Truro, MA;
21c Museum Hotel, Nashville, TN;
The 8th Floor, New York, NY;
The Art League, Alexandra, VA;
Tasmanian College of the Arts at the University of Tasmania, Hobart, Tasmania, Australia;
QUAGOMA, Brisbane, Australia;
RayGun Projects, Toowoomba, Australia;
UNSW Art & Design, Sydney, Australia;
Carriageworks, Sydney, Australia;
MCA Santa Barbara, Santa Barbara, CA;
LACE, Los Angeles, CA;
California State University, Northridge, CA;
Sotheby’s Institute, Los Angeles, CA;
California State University Long Beach, Long Beach, CA;
UNLV Marjorie Barrick Museum, Las Vegas, NV;
San Francisco Art Institute, San Francisco, CA;
The University of California Davis, Davis, CA;
Richmond Art Center, Oakland, CA;
California College of the Arts, San Francisco, CA;
California State University Chico, Chico, CA;
Minneapolis College of Art and Design, Minneapolis, MN;
Bemis Center for Contemporary Arts, Omaha, NE;
Des Moines Art Center, Des Moines, IA;
Walker Art Center, Minneapolis, MN;
Penn State School of Visual Arts, University Park, PA;
Georgetown University, Washington, DC;
Hirshhorn Museum and Sculpture Garden, Washington, DC;
Hillyer Art Space, Washington, DC;
Area 405, Baltimore, MD;
The Motor House, Baltimore, MD;
College of New Rochelle, New Rochelle, CT;
MIT List Art Center, Cambridge, MA;
Western Connecticut State University, Danbury, CT;
Tyler School of Art at Temple University, Philadelphia, PA;
Strand Book Store, New York, NY
 2016
Hirshhorn Museum and Sculpture Garden, Washington, DC

Professional experience 
Sharon Louden has taught studio and professional practice classes to students of all levels in colleges and universities throughout the United States since 1991, including Kansas City Art Institute, The College of Saint Rose, Massachusetts College of Art, Maryland Institute College of Art, New York Academy of Art, University of North Texas, Vanderbilt University and Tyler School of Art. She continues to conduct online Professional Practice Workshops for artists around the country in collaboration with non-profit organizations, such as Creative Capital, Americans for the Arts, and the Brooklyn Arts Council. In 2018, she was named the first woman Artistic Director of the Visual Arts at Chautauqua Institution in Western New York.

Since 1999, Louden has led an art-making workshop for children all across the country entitled "Glowtown". Hosting venues include museums, non-profit art centers, and public schools: the Aldrich Contemporary Art Museum (1999), Katonah Museum of Art (2005), Peekskill High School in Peekskill, New York (2005), the Birmingham Museum of Art (2008), the 5.4.7 Arts Center in Greensburg, Kansas (2010), the Community Library in Ketchum, Idaho (2011), the Pelham Arts Center in Pelham, New York (2012), the Weisman Art Museum in Minneapolis, Minnesota (2016), and the Philbrook Museum of Art in Tulsa, Oklahoma (2019).

From February 2012 to February 2014, Louden served as the Chair of the Services to Artists Committee of the College Art Association. She has also contributed as a board member for various non-profit organizations, including Seed Space, the Visual Arts at Chautauqua Institution, and the Elizabeth Foundation for the Arts.

Lecture organization 
Between 2009 and 2019, Louden organized and moderated the Professional Practice Lecture Series at the New York Academy of Art, which included Randy Cohen, Deana Haggag, Hrag Vartanian, Andrianna Campbell, Jillian Steinhauer, Andrew Russeth, Jerry Saltz, Roberta Smith, Robert Storr, Ken Johnson, Caroline Woolard, William Powhida, Paddy Johnson, Laura Hoptman, Jessica Lynne and Carter Foster.

Personal life 
She is married to a media producer, jazz musician and activist Vinson Valega and lives and works in New York City.

References

External links 
 
 Sharon Louden at Holly Johnson Gallery
 Sharon Louden at Patrick Heide Contemporary
 Sharon Louden Books
 

1964 births
School of the Art Institute of Chicago alumni
College of Saint Rose
Living people
Yale School of Art alumni
Artists from Philadelphia
People from Olney, Maryland
People from Sandy Spring, Maryland